Jean-Émile Charon (25 February 1920, in Paris – June 1998, in Paris) was a French nuclear physicist, philosopher and writer. He was the author of over 20 books on physics, scientific philosophy, and computer science. He conducted nuclear research at France's Commissariat à l'énergie atomique (Atomic Energy Authority).

Work
Charon muses in his book The Spirit: That Stranger Inside Us (2004): "There are microscopic individualities inside every human. They think, they know, and (they) carry Spirit in the Universe." Charon chooses to call these individual beings of intelligence, "eons." They are otherwise known as electrons. Each electron or "eon" is an enclosed space, a thinking entity, intelligence, and even a micro-universe. But this is an inaccurate way of speaking about them, because as Michael Talbot  warns us in The Holographic Universe (1991), "the only time quanta ever manifest as particles is when we are looking at them." Thus, it would be more accurate to think of these beings in terms of wave interference patterns.

"You are the 'spiritual intersection' of all these particles," continues Charon "Your eons will remember you, your 'I,' for all their lives. They'll carry it with them in their future life….And this future life in the body of eons will be very long, almost as long as the Universe itself." Suggests Charon, "the electrons which form my body are not only carriers of what I call 'my' spirit, but, in fact constitute my spirit itself." Electrons are sent individually into the Universe to learn and to increase the order of the Universe; "the psychic level of the whole Universe progressively elevates itself…during the 'successively lived experiences' of elemental matter." The goal of each electron is to increase its energy to the highest level of sustainable excitement; that is, to contain the most information within the largest stable system of organization possible. The electron becomes part of increasingly more complex forms; living the life cycle of that form. At the death of that form, electrons leave the body, taking their informational energy with them.

The goal of the electron is developing the order of its Spirit. There are four psychic forces that organize living forms into entities of increasing energy or order: reflection, knowledge, love, and action. As the order grows, so do the psychic properties.

Ecstasy, says Charon, is the higher level of excitement felt when the electron fills one plane with photon energy, to the threshold at which it jumps to the next quantum level—ignites, until the entire system is fully energized.

"(A)n interaction of 'internal Love' exists among the electrons of our body, alongside the interaction of 'external Love,' between our electrons and those of 'others'." By linking with the 'other' through love or knowledge, the electron increases its order and ability to hold organized energy. "It finally increases its spiritual faculties; its 'consciousness'….To grow spiritually is to project more of our Love toward 'others'." "Love is the simplest and most efficient process to increase negentropy (order) in the Universe." Charon explains addiction to TV, computers, and music listening in terms of the attraction of our electrons to that which increases order and energy to their informational richness. It is an inbuilt desire to become part of that larger order. This also explains the phenomenon of mob mind.

Selected writings
 Charon, J-E. Theorie de la Relativité Complexe. Paris: Albin Michel, 1977.
 Translated title: Complex Relativity: Unifying All Four Physical Interactions, Paragon House Publishing, 1988.
 Charon, J-E. L'Esprit, cet Inconnu. Paris: Albin Michel, 1977.
 Translated title: The Spirit: That Stranger Inside Us, Infinity Publishing, 2004.
 1st Translation: The Unknown Spirit: The Unity of Spirit and Matter in Space and Time, Coventure, 1983.

References

Bibliography

External links
 A few articles 

1920 births
1998 deaths
French physicists
French nuclear physicists
Quantum mysticism advocates